Gangaw is a town of Gangaw Township in Gangaw District in the Magway Division in Myanmar. Gangaw is also known as the City of Yaw, a certain region in Myanmar including Gangaw, Tilin, Saw and villages around them. Gangaw District and Gangaw township was a part of Pakokku District until 2003.In 2003,Gangaw District was established. Myit Thar river flows from South to North dividing the town into Gangaw and Western Gangaw village.

Kale-Gangaw Road was a main roadway linking Gangaw and Kalaymyo.
Mandalay-Gangaw Road is a main Road linking the center of Myanmar.

Climate
Gangaw has a tropical savanna climate (Köppen Aw) with three seasons. The “cool” season from December to February is dry and clear with cool mornings and very warm to hot afternoons, gradually heating up to the sweltering and unpleasant “hot” season from March to mid-May, and to the monsoonal wet season from mid-May to October. Rainfall in Gangaw is lessened substantially by rain shadow effects from the Arakan Mountains to the west, although the city is less dry than Pakokku or Mandalay.

The  rainfall collected on 19 October 2011 was a new record for Gangaw for October over the past 47 years.

References

Populated places in Magway Region
Township capitals of Myanmar